A Broadway Butterfly is a 1925 American silent comedy film directed by William Beaudine.

Plot
As described in a film magazine review, Irene Astaire is befriended by Cookie Dale and gets a job in the chorus, although Cookie is dismissed to please male backers of the show. Irene falls in love with a wealthy youth, Ronald Steel, but Crane Wilder wants Irene and plots with Thelma to disgrace Irene. Cookie foils them although Donald sees Wilder leaving Irene’s apartment, and he turns to Thelma. Irene is discouraged and seeks diversion on Broadway. Cookie saves her again and it then develops Cookie is the runaway daughter of a wealthy family and Donald and Irene are once more united.

Cast

Status
With no prints of A Broadway Butterfly located in any film archives, it is a lost film.

References

External links

Lobby card at moviestillsdb.com

1925 films
1925 comedy films
1925 lost films
Silent American comedy films
American silent feature films
American black-and-white films
Films directed by William Beaudine
Lost American films
Lost comedy films
1920s American films